The 1st Iowa Light Artillery Battery was a light artillery battery from Iowa that served in the Union Army between August 17, 1861, and July 5, 1865, during the American Civil War.

Service 
The 1st Iowa Light Artillery was mustered into Federal service at Burlington, Iowa for a three-year enlistment on August 17, 1861. The regiment was mustered out of Federal service on July 5, 1865.

Total strength and casualties 
A total of 266 men served in the 1st Iowa Battery at one time or another during its existence.
It suffered 10 enlisted men who were killed in action or who died of their wounds and 1 officer and 50 enlisted men who died of disease, for a total of 61 fatalities#

References

Bibliography 
The Civil War Archive

Units and formations of the Union Army from Iowa
Artillery units and formations of the American Civil War
Military units and formations established in 1861
1861 establishments in Iowa
Military units and formations disestablished in 1865